Torpa stenhus (translated Torpa stone house) is a well-preserved medieval castle near lake Åsunden, in the county of Västra Götaland, southern Sweden.

History 
The first stone house was built around 1470 by Privy Council Arvid Knutsson as a fortress against the Danes. Reconstruction and remodeling of the fortress was made during the 1500s and 1600s, for example the staircase tower, built in the middle of the 16th century. The castle has a well-preserved Renaissance interior with grisaille wall paintings. The chapel in the ground floor was decorated in the late 17th century in a baroque style. The castle is best known in Swedish history as the home of the noble family Stenbock. It was the residence of Catherine Stenbock, third and last consort of King Gustav I of Sweden.

The house today 
In recent years, the castle have been undergoing an interior reconstruction, with the original wooden walls reinstalled. These were torn down when the building was used as a granary in the 19th century. 
 
Today the house can be seen with guided tours.

See also
List of castles and palaces in Sweden

References

External links
 Torpa stenhus official website

Castles in Västra Götaland County
Museums in Västra Götaland County
Historic house museums in Sweden